Boris Preti (born 6 February 1968) is an Italian gymnast. He competed at the 1988 Summer Olympics, the 1992 Summer Olympics and the 1996 Summer Olympics.

References

External links
 

1968 births
Living people
Italian male artistic gymnasts
Olympic gymnasts of Italy
Gymnasts at the 1988 Summer Olympics
Gymnasts at the 1992 Summer Olympics
Gymnasts at the 1996 Summer Olympics
People from Gallarate
Sportspeople from the Province of Varese